Sir Henry Cecil Johnson  (11 September 1906 – 13 March 1988), was Chairman of British Rail. Johnson astutely began the sale and development of surplus railway land and established the British Rail Property Board in 1970. The finances of British Railways improved under Johnson's chairmanship and when he left in 1971, British Rail had a surplus of £9.7 million. Sir Peter Parker, a later Chairman, ‘admired his honesty and courage', describing him as ‘straight as a gun barrel’.

Early life
Henry Cecil Johnson was born in Lavendon, Buckinghamshire on 11 September 1906, the son of William Longland and Alice Mary Johnson of Lavendon, Buckinghamshire. He was educated at Bedford Modern School.

Career
Johnson joined the London and North Eastern Railway (LNER) as a traffic apprentice in 1923. After various posts in the Operating Department of LNER, Johnson was appointed Assistant Superintendent of Southern Area, LNER, in 1942. In 1955 he became Chief Operating Superintendent of the Eastern Region and later General Manager in 1958.

In 1962, Johnson became General Manager of the London Midland Region, and was also its Chairman between 1963 and 1967. He ‘took charge of the electrification of the Euston to Manchester and Liverpool line, the first main-line electrification, completed in 1966’. Johnson became Vice-Chairman of the British Railways Board in 1967 and was appointed its Chairman in 1968, a position he held until 1971.

The finances of British Railways improved under Johnson's chairmanship and when he left in 1971, British Rail had a surplus of £9.7 million. Although this was largely as a result of the Transport Act 1968, when grants were made to unprofitable passenger services providing a public service, Johnson astutely began the development of surplus railway land and established the British Rail Property Board in 1970. In the 1970s British Railways earned £20 million a year from land sales.

After British Railways, Johnson became Chairman of MEPC (1971–76) and held board positions at Lloyds Bank, the Trident Life Assurance Company and Imperial Life of Canada.

Awards and honours
Johnson was appointed CBE in 1962, made Knight Bachelor in 1968 and KBE in 1972.

Personal life
Always known as Bill Johnson, ‘he had a friendly and relaxed manner, but he was shrewd, a good listener, and expert at delegating’. Sir Peter Parker, a later Chairman, ‘admired his honesty and courage', describing him as ‘straight as a gun barrel. He was ‘extremely popular with the railway employees, who admired him as [then being] the only railwayman to have started at the bottom and worked his way up through the ranks to become Chairman of British Railways’.

Johnson was a member of the Marylebone Cricket Club and The Royal and Ancient Golf Club of St Andrews. The BBC's Your Paintings Series has a portrait of Johnson. In 1932 he married Evelyn Mary Morton; they had two daughters.  He died on 13 March 1988 in Great Missenden, Buckinghamshire.

References

External links
Sir Henry Johnson’s entry in the Dictionary of National Biography
Sir Henry Johnson at Art UK

Knights Commander of the Order of the British Empire
People educated at Bedford Modern School
1906 births
1988 deaths
British Rail people